The 2023 season will be the Birmingham Stallions' upcoming 2nd season in the United States Football League and their 2nd under head coach, Skip Holtz and 1st under general manager Zach Potter.

Draft

Personnel

Roster

Staff

Schedule

Regular Season

Standings

References

Birmingham
Birmingham Stallions
Birmingham Stallions (2022)